Hem, named Cai at birth is a Minor Bard in the Pellinor series of fantasy adventure books by Alison Croggon. He is the brother of Maerad and like her has amazing Bardic skills.
At a very early age, Cai, as he was then known, was taken from his home by a group of Hulls during the sacking of Pellinor. They renamed him Hem, to better fit the realm in which they lived, and spent much effort and energy in trying to pervert him and bring him to the side of the Dark.

Powers and abilities
Hem has a large Bardic power, as he is of the house of Karn. As with his sister Maerad, his raw power seems huge. Although little has been seen of his performing magery, he has not been tired by it, and has mastered complex spells, leading to speculation that he is of the same strength as Maerad. If indeed he is, he will be able to do similar feats as she, including conversing in the Elidhu language without needing to learn it. He seems largely skilled in deceptive imagery — e.g.: glimmerspells and shadowveils, which are used to disguise or conceal — possibly because of needing to do so in his early childhood, and he is also naturally gifted in Healing.

Possessions
Due to his early kidnapping, Hem owns few items. His most cherished possession is the symbol of the House of Karn which he keeps in a cloth bag held closely round his neck. He is accompanied a white crow named Irc, who in some ways is his familiar.

Hem has recently been told by a Tree Elidhu that he is the second Foretold One, as both "the brother and sister" are needed: one to sing the Treesong and one to play the tune and listen.

Characters in fantasy literature